In ancient Greek religion and mythology, Demeter (Attic:  Dēmḗtēr ; Doric:  Dāmā́tēr) is the Olympian goddess of the harvest and agriculture, presiding over crops, grains, food, and the fertility of the earth. Although she is mostly known as a grain goddess, she also appeared as a goddess of health, birth, and marriage, and had connections to the Underworld. She is also called Deo. In Greek tradition, Demeter is the second child of the Titans Rhea and Cronus, and sister to Hestia, Hera, Hades, Poseidon, and Zeus. Like her other siblings but Zeus, she was swallowed by her father as an infant and rescued by Zeus.

Through her brother Zeus, she became the mother of Persephone, a fertility goddess. One of the most notable Homeric Hymns, the Homeric Hymn to Demeter, tells the story of Persephone's abduction by Hades and Demeter's search for her. When Hades, the King of the Underworld, wished to make Persephone his wife, he abducted her from a field while she was picking flowers, with Zeus' leave. Demeter searched everywhere to find her missing daughter to no avail until she was informed that Hades had taken her to the Underworld. In response, Demeter neglected her duties as goddess of agriculture, plunging the earth into a deadly famine where nothing would grow, causing mortals to die. Zeus ordered Hades to return Persephone to her mother to avert the disaster. However, because Persephone had eaten food from the Underworld, she could not stay with Demeter forever but had to divide the year between her mother and her husband, explaining the seasonal cycle, as Demeter does not let plants grow while Persephone is gone.

Though Demeter is often described simply as the goddess of the harvest, she presided also over the sacred law, and the cycle of life and death. She and her daughter Persephone were the central figures of the Eleusinian Mysteries, a religious tradition that predated the Olympian pantheon and which may have its roots in the Mycenaean period c. 1400–1200 BC.

Demeter was often considered to be the same figure as the Anatolian goddess Cybele, and she was identified with the Roman goddess Ceres.

Etymology
Demeter may appear in Linear A as da-ma-te on three documents (AR Zf 1 and 2, and KY Za 2), all three dedicated to religious situations and all three bearing just the name (i-da-ma-te on AR Zf 1 and 2). It is unlikely that Demeter appears as da-ma-te in a Linear B (Mycenean Greek) inscription (PY En 609); the word , da-ma-te, probably refers to "households". On the other hand, si-to-po-ti-ni-ja, "Potnia of the Grain", is regarded as referring to her Bronze Age predecessor or to one of her epithets.

Demeter's character as mother-goddess is identified in the second element of her name meter derived from Proto-Indo-European (PIE) *méh₂tēr (mother). In antiquity, different explanations were already proffered for the first element of her name. It is possible that Da, a word which corresponds to Gē in Attic, is the Doric form of De, "earth", the old name of the chthonic earth-goddess, and that Demeter is "Mother-Earth". Liddell & Scott find this "improbable" and Beekes writes, "there is no indication that [da] means "earth", although it has also been assumed in the name of Poseidon found in the Linear B inscription E-ne-si-da-o-ne, "earth-shaker". John Chadwick also argues that the dā element in the name of Demeter is not so simply equated with "earth".

M. L. West has proposed that the word Demeter, initially Damater, could be a borrowing from an Illyrian deity attested in the Messapic goddess Damatura, with a form dā- ("earth", from PIE *dʰǵʰ(e)m-) attached to -matura ("mother"), akin to the Illyrian god Dei-paturos (dei-, "sky", attached to -paturos, "father"). The Lesbian form Dō- may simply reflect a different colloquial pronunciation of the non-Greek name.

According to a more popular theory, the element De- might be connected with Deo, an epithet of Demeter and it could derive from the Cretan word dea, Ionic zeia—variously identified with emmer, spelt, rye, or other grains by modern scholars—so that she is the Mother and the giver of food generally. This view is shared by British scholar Jane Ellen Harrison, who suggests that Démeter's name means Grain-Mother, instead of Earth-Mother.

Wanax (wa-na-ka) was her male companion (Greek: Πάρεδρος, Paredros) in Mycenaean cult. The Arcadian cult links her to the god Poseidon, who probably substituted the male companion of the Great Goddess; Demeter may therefore be related to a Minoan Great Goddess (Cybele).

An alternative Proto-Indo-European etymology comes through Potnia and Despoina, where Des- represents a derivative of PIE *dem (house, dome), and Demeter is "mother of the house" (from PIE *dems-méh₂tēr). R. S. P. Beekes rejects a Greek interpretation, but not necessarily an Indo-European one.

Iconography

Demeter was frequently associated with images of the harvest, including flowers, fruit, and grain. She was also sometimes pictured with her daughter Persephone. However, Demeter is not generally portrayed with any of her consorts; the exception is Iasion, the youth of Crete who lay with her in a thrice-ploughed field and was killed afterward by a jealous Zeus with a thunderbolt.

Demeter is assigned the zodiac constellation Virgo, the Virgin, by Marcus Manilius in his 1st-century Roman work Astronomicon. In art, the constellation Virgo holds Spica, a sheaf of wheat in her hand and sits beside constellation Leo the Lion.

In Arcadia, she was known as "Black Demeter". She was said to have taken the form of a mare to escape the pursuit of her younger brother, Poseidon, and having been raped by him despite her disguise, she dressed all in black and retreated into a cave to mourn and to purify herself. She was consequently depicted with the head of a horse in this region.

A sculpture of the Black Demeter was made by Onatas.

Description

A Goddess of Harvest

In epic poetry and Hesiod's Theogony, Demeter is the Corn-Mother, the goddess of cereals who provides grain for bread and blesses its harvesters. This was her main function at Eleusis, and she became panhellenic. In Cyprus, "grain-harvesting" was damatrizein.

The central theme in the Eleusinian Mysteries was the reunion of Persephone with her mother, Demeter when new crops were reunited with the old seed, a form of eternity.

According to the Athenian rhetorician Isocrates, Demeter's greatest gifts to humankind were agriculture, particularly of cereals, and the Mysteries, which give the initiate higher hopes in this life and the afterlife.

These two gifts were intimately connected in Demeter's myths and mystery cults. In Hesiod, prayers to Zeus-Chthonios (chthonic Zeus) and Demeter help the crops grow full and strong. Demeter's emblem is the poppy, a bright red flower that grows among the barley.

Demeter was also zeidoros arοura, the Homeric "Mother Earth arοura" who gave the gift of cereals (zeai or deai).

As an earth and underworld goddess
In addition to her role as an agricultural goddess, Demeter was often worshipped more generally as a goddess of the earth. For example, in Arcadia, she was represented as snake-haired, holding a dove and dolphin, perhaps to symbolize her power over the Underworld, the air, and the water.

In the cult of Flya, she was worshipped as Anesidora who sends up gifts from the Underworld. There was a temple of Demeter under this name in Phlya.

In Sparta, she was known as Demeter-Chthonia (chthonic Demeter). The Athenians called the dead "Demetrioi", and this may reflect a link between Demeter and the ancient cult of the dead, linked to the agrarian belief that a new life would sprout from the dead body, as a new plant arises from buried seed. This was most likely a belief shared by initiates in Demeter's mysteries, as interpreted by Pindar: "Blessed is he who has seen before he goes under the earth; for he knows the end of life and knows also its divine beginning."

In the mysteries of Pheneos in Arcadia, Demeter was known as Cidaria. Her priest would put on the mask of Demeter, which was kept secret. The cult may have been connected with both the Underworld and a form of agrarian magic.

As a poppy goddess
Theocritus described one of Demeter's earlier roles as that of a goddess of poppies:

Karl Kerényi asserted that poppies were connected with a Cretan cult which was eventually carried to the Eleusinian Mysteries in Classical Greece. In a clay statuette from Gazi, the Minoan poppy goddess wears the seed capsules, sources of nourishment and narcosis, in her diadem. According to Kerényi, "It seems probable that the Great Mother Goddess who bore the names Rhea and Demeter, brought the poppy with her from her Cretan cult to Eleusis and it is almost certain that in the Cretan cult sphere opium was prepared from poppies."

Robert Graves speculated that the meaning of the depiction and use of poppies in the Greco-Roman myths is the symbolism of the bright scarlet colour as signifying the promise of resurrection after death.

Worship

In Crete
The earliest recorded worship of a deity possibly equivalent to Demeter is found in Linear B Mycenean Greek tablets of c. 1400–1200 BC found at Pylos. The tablets describe the worship of the "two queens and the king", which may be related to Demeter, Persephone and Poseidon. An early name which may refer to Demeter, si-to-po-ti-ni-ja (Sito Potnia), appears in Linear B inscriptions found at Mycenae and Pylos. In Crete, Poseidon was often given the title wa-na-ka (wanax) in Linear B inscriptions, in his role as King of the Underworld, and his title  E-ne-si-da-o-ne indicates his chthonic nature. In the cave of Amnisos, Enesidaon is associated with the cult of Eileithyia, the goddess of childbirth, who was involved with the annual birth of the divine child. During the Bronze Age, a goddess of nature dominated both in Minoan and Mycenean cults, and Wanax (wa-na-ka) was her male companion (paredros) in the Mycenean cult. Elements of this early form of worship survived in the Eleusinian cult, where the following words were uttered: "the mighty Potnia had born a strong son."

On the Greek mainland
Tablets from Pylos record sacrificial goods destined for "the Two Queens and Poseidon" ("to the Two Queens and the King":wa-na-ssoi, wa-na-ka-te). The "Two Queens" may be related to Demeter and Persephone or their precursors, goddesses who were no longer associated with Poseidon in later periods.

Major cults to Demeter are known at Eleusis in Attica, Hermion (in Crete), Megara, Celeae, Lerna, Aegila, Munychia, Corinth, Delos, Priene, Akragas, Iasos, Pergamon, Selinus, Tegea, Thoricus, Dion (in Macedonia) Lykosoura, Mesembria, Enna, and Samothrace.

Probably the earliest Amphictyony centred on the cult of Demeter at Anthele (Ἀνθήλη), lay on the coast of Malis south of Thessaly, near Thermopylae.

Mysian Demeter had a seven-day festival at Pellené in Arcadia. The geographer Pausanias passed the shrine to Mysian Demeter on the road from Mycenae to Argos and reports that according to Argive tradition, the shrine was founded by an Argive named Mysius who venerated Demeter.

"Saint Demetra"
Even after Theodosius I issued the Edict of Thessalonica and banned paganism throughout the Roman Empire, people throughout Greece continued to pray to Demeter as "Saint Demetra", patron saint of agriculture. Around 1765–1766, the antiquary Richard Chandler, alongside the architect Nicholas Revett and the painter William Pars, visited Eleusis and mentioned a statue of a Caryatid as well as the folklore that surrounded it, they stated that it was considered sacred by the locals because it protected their crops. They called the statue "Saint Demetra", a saint whose story had many similarities to the myth of Demeter and Persephone, except that her daughter had been abducted by the Turks and not by Hades. The locals covered the statue with flowers to ensure the fertility of their fields. This tradition continued until the 19th century, when the statue was forcibly removed by Edward Daniel Clarke who presented it to the University of Cambridge.

Festivals

Demeter's two major festivals were sacred mysteries. Her Thesmophoria festival (11–13 October) was women-only. Her Eleusinian mysteries were open to initiates of any gender or social class. At the heart of both festivals were myths concerning Demeter as Mother and Persephone as her daughter.

Conflation with other goddesses
In the Roman period, Demeter became conflated with the Roman agricultural goddess Ceres through interpretatio romana. The worship of Demeter has formally merged with that of Ceres around 205 BC, along with the ritus graecia cereris, a Greek-inspired form of cult, as part of Rome's general religious recruitment of deities as allies against Carthage, towards the end of the Second Punic War. The cult originated in southern Italy (part of Magna Graecia) and was probably based on the Thesmophoria, a mystery cult dedicated to Demeter and Persephone as "Mother and Maiden". It arrived along with its Greek priestesses, who were granted Roman citizenship so that they could pray to the gods "with a foreign and external knowledge, but with a domestic and civil intention". The new cult was installed in the already ancient Temple of Ceres, Liber and Libera, Rome's Aventine patrons of the plebs; from the end of the 3rd century BC, Demeter's temple at Enna, in Sicily, was acknowledged as Ceres' oldest, most authoritative cult centre, and Libera was recognized as Proserpina, Roman equivalent to Persephone. Their joint cult recalls Demeter's search for Persephone after the latter's abduction into the Underworld by Hades. At the Aventine, the new cult took its place alongside the old. It did not refer to Liber, whose open and gender-mixed cult played a central role in plebeian culture as a patron and protector of plebeian rights, freedoms and values. The exclusively female initiates and priestesses of the new "greek style" mysteries of Ceres and Proserpina were expected to uphold Rome's traditional, patrician-dominated social hierarchy and traditional morality. Unmarried girls should emulate the chastity of Proserpina, the maiden; married women should seek to emulate Ceres, the devoted and fruitful mother. Their rites were intended to secure a good harvest and increase the fertility of those who partook in the mysteries.

Beginning in the 5th century BCE in Asia Minor, Demeter was also considered equivalent to the Phrygian goddess Cybele. Demeter's festival of Thesmophoria was popular throughout Asia Minor, and the myth of Persephone and Adonis in many ways mirrors the myth of Cybele and Attis.

Some late antique sources syncretized several "great goddess" figures into a single deity. For example, the Platonist philosopher Apuleius, writing in the late 2nd century, identified Ceres (Demeter) with Isis, having her declare:
I, mother of the universe, mistress of all the elements, first-born of the ages, highest of the gods, queen of the shades, first of those who dwell in heaven, representing in one shape all gods and goddesses. My will controls the shining heights of heaven, the health-giving sea winds, and the mournful silences of hell; the entire world worships my single godhead in a thousand shapes, with divers rites, and under many a different name. The Phrygians, first-born of mankind, call me the Pessinuntian Mother of the gods; ... the ancient Eleusinians Actaean Ceres; ... and the Egyptians who excel in ancient learning, honour me with the worship which is truly mine and call me by my true name: Queen Isis.
--Apuleius, translated by E. J. Kenny. The Golden Ass

Mythology

Lineage, consorts, and offspring

Hesiod's Theogony (c. 700 BC) describes Demeter as the second daughter and child of Cronus and Rhea. Like her sisters and two of her brothers, she was swallowed as a newborn by her father due to his fear of being overthrown by one of his children; she was freed when her youngest brother Zeus made Cronus disgorge all his children by giving him a special potion.

Demeter is notable as the mother of Persephone, described by both Hesiod and in the Homeric Hymn to Demeter as the result of a union with her younger brother Zeus. An alternate recounting of the matter appears in a fragment of the lost Orphic theogony, which preserves part of a myth in which Zeus mates with his mother, Rhea, in the form of a snake, explaining the origin of the symbol on Hermes' staff. Their daughter is said to be Persephone, whom Zeus, in turn, mates with to conceive Dionysus. According to the Orphic fragments, "After becoming the mother of Zeus, she who was formerly Rhea became Demeter."

Before her abduction by Hades, Persephone was known as Kore ("maiden"), and there is some evidence that the figures of Persephone, Queen of the Underworld and Kore, daughter of Demeter, were initially considered separate goddesses. However, they must have become conflated by the time of Hesiod in the 7th century BC. Demeter and Persephone were often worshipped together and were often referred to by joint cultic titles. In their cult at Eleusis, they were referred to simply as "the goddesses", usually distinguished as "the older" and "the younger"; in Rhodes and Sparta, they were worshipped as "the Demeters"; in the Thesmophoria, they were known as "the thesmophoroi" ("the legislators"). In Arcadia they were known as "the Great Goddesses" and "the mistresses". In Mycenaean Pylos, Demeter and Persephone were probably called the "queens" (wa-na-ssoi).

Both Homer and Hesiod, writing c. 700 BC, described Demeter making love with the agricultural hero Iasion in a ploughed field. According to Hesiod, this union resulted in the birth of Plutus.

According to Diodorus Siculus, in his Bibliotheca historica written in the 1st century BC, Demeter and Zeus were also the parents of Dionysus. Diodorus described the myth of Dionysus' double birth (once from the earth, i.e. Demeter, when the plant sprouts) and once from the vine (when the fruit sprouts from the plant). Diodorus also related a version of the myth of Dionysus' destruction by the Titans ("sons of Gaia"), who boiled him, and how Demeter gathered up his remains so that he could be born a third time (Diod. iii.62). Diodorus states that Dionysus' birth from Zeus and his older sister Demeter was somewhat of a minority belief, possibly via conflation of Demeter with her daughter, as most sources state that the parents of Dionysus were Zeus and Persephone, and later Zeus and Semele.

In Arcadia, a major Arcadian deity known as Despoina ("Mistress") was said to be the daughter of Demeter and Poseidon. According to Pausanias, a Thelpusian tradition said that during Demeter's search for Persephone, Poseidon pursued her. Demeter turned into a horse to avoid her younger brother's advances. However, he turned into a stallion and mated with the goddess, resulting in the birth of the horse god Arion and a daughter "whose name they are not wont to divulge to the uninitiated". Elsewhere, he says that the Phigalians assert that the offspring of Poseidon and Demeter was not a horse, but Despoina, "as the Arcadians call her".

In Orphic literature, Demeter seems to be the mother of the witchcraft goddess Hecate.

The goddess took Mecon, a young Athenian, as a lover; he was at some point transformed into a poppy flower.

Abduction of Persephone

Demeter's daughter Persephone was abducted to the Underworld by Hades, who received permission from her father Zeus to take her as his bride. Demeter searched for her ceaselessly for nine days, preoccupied with her grief. Hecate then approached her and said that while she had not seen what happened to Persephone, she heard her screams. Together the two goddesses went to Helios, the sun god, who witnessed everything that happened on earth thanks to his lofty position. Helios then revealed to Demeter that Hades had snatched a screaming Persephone to make her his wife with the permission of Zeus, the girl's father. Demeter then filled with anger. The seasons halted; living things ceased their growth and began to die. Faced with the extinction of all life on earth, Zeus sent his messenger Hermes to the Underworld to bring Persephone back. Hades agreed to release her if she had eaten nothing while in his realm, but Persephone had eaten a small number of pomegranate seeds. This bound her to Hades and the Underworld for certain months of every year, most likely the dry Mediterranean summer, when plant life is threatened by drought, despite the popular belief that it is autumn or winter. There are several variations on the basic myth; the earliest account, the Homeric Hymn to Demeter, relates that Persephone is secretly slipped a pomegranate seed by Hades and in Ovid's version, Persephone willingly and secretly eats the pomegranate seeds, thinking to deceive Hades, but is discovered and made to stay. Contrary to popular perception, Persephone's time in the Underworld does not correspond with the unfruitful seasons of the ancient Greek calendar, nor her return to the upper world with springtime. Demeter's descent to retrieve Persephone from the Underworld is connected to the Eleusinian Mysteries.

The myth of the capture of Persephone seems to be pre-Greek. In the Greek version, Ploutos (πλούτος, wealth) represents the wealth of the corn that was stored in underground silos or ceramic jars (pithoi). Similar subterranean pithoi were used in ancient times for funerary practices. At the beginning of the autumn, when the corn of the old crop is laid on the fields, she ascends and is reunited with her mother, Demeter, for at this time, the old crop and the new meet each other.

According to the personal mythology of Robert Graves, Persephone is not only the younger self of Demeter, she is in turn also one of three guises of the Triple Goddess – Kore (the youngest, the maiden, signifying young green grain), Persephone (in the middle, the nymph, representing the ripe grain waiting to be harvested), and Hecate (the eldest of the three, the crone, the harvested grain), which to a certain extent reduces the name and role of Demeter to that of the group name. Before her abduction, she is called Kore; and once taken, she becomes Persephone ('she who brings destruction').

In the Orphic tradition, while she was searching for her daughter, a mortal woman named Baubo received Demeter as her guest and offered her a meal and wine. Demeter declined them both because she mourned the loss of Persephone. Baubo then, thinking she had displeased the goddess, lifted her skirt and showed her genitalia to the goddess, simultaneously revealing Iacchus, Demeter's son. Demeter was most pleased with the sight and delighted she accepted the food and wine. This tale survives in the account of Clement of Alexandria, a Christian who tried to discredit pagan practices and mythology. However, several Baubo figurines (figurines of women revealing their vulvas) have been discovered, supporting the story.

Demeter at Eleusis

Demeter's search for her daughter Persephone took her to the palace of Celeus, the King of Eleusis in Attica. She assumed the form of an old woman and asked him for shelter. He took her in, to nurse Demophon and Triptolemus, his sons by Metanira. To reward his kindness, she planned to make Demophon immortal; she secretly anointed the boy with ambrosia and laid him in the hearth's flames to gradually burn away his mortal self. But Metanira walked in, saw her son in the fire and screamed in fright. Demeter abandoned the attempt. Instead, she taught Triptolemus the secrets of agriculture, and he, in turn, taught them to any who wished to learn them. Thus, humanity learned how to plant, grow and harvest grain. The myth has several versions; some are linked to figures such as Eleusis, Rarus and Trochilus. The Demophon element may be based on an earlier folk tale.

Demeter and Iasion
Homer's Odyssey (c. late 8th century BC) contains perhaps the earliest direct references to the myth of Demeter and her consort Iasion, a Samothracian hero whose name may refer to bindweed, a small white flower that frequently grows in wheat fields. In the Odyssey, Calypso describes how Demeter, "without disguise", made love to Iasion. "So it was when Demeter of the braided tresses followed her heart and lay in love with Iasion in the triple-furrowed field; Zeus was aware of it soon enough and hurled the bright thunderbolt and killed him." However, Ovid states that Iasion lived up to old age as the husband of Demeter. In ancient Greek culture, part of the opening of each agricultural year involved the cutting of three furrows in the field to ensure its fertility.

Hesiod expanded on the basics of this myth. According to him, the liaison between Demeter and Iasion took place at the wedding of Cadmus and Harmonia in Crete. Demeter, in this version, had lured Iasion away from the other revellers. Hesiod says that Demeter subsequently gave birth to Plutus.

Demeter and Poseidon

In Arcadia, located in what is now southern Greece, the major goddess Despoina was considered the daughter of Demeter and Poseidon Hippios ("Horse-Poseidon"). In the associated myths, Poseidon represents the river spirit of the Underworld, and he appears as a horse, as often happens in northern European folklore. The myth describes how he pursued his older sister, Demeter, who hid from him among the horses of the king Onkios, but even in the form of a mare, she could not conceal her divinity. Poseidon caught and raped his older sister in the form of a stallion. Demeter was furious at Poseidon's assault; in this furious form, she became known as Demeter Erinys. Her anger at Poseidon drove her to dress all in black and retreat into a cave to purify herself, an act which was the cause of a universal famine. Demeter's absence caused the death of crops, livestock, and eventually of the people who depended on them (later Arcadian tradition held that it was both her rage at Poseidon and her loss of her daughter caused the famine, merging the two myths). Demeter washed away her anger in the River Ladon, becoming Demeter Lousia, the "bathed Demeter".

"In her alliance with Poseidon," Kerényi noted, "she was Earth, who bears plants and beasts, and could therefore assume the shape of an ear of grain or a mare." Moreover, she bore a daughter Despoina (: the "Mistress"), whose name should not be uttered outside the Arcadian Mysteries, and a horse named Arion, with a black mane and tail.

At Phigaleia, a xoanon (wood-carved statue) of Demeter was erected in a cave which, tradition held, was the cave into which Black Demeter retreated. The statue depicted a Medusa-like figure with a horse's head and snake-like hair, holding a dove and a dolphin, which probably represented her power over air and water:

Demeter and Erysichthon

Another myth involving Demeter's rage resulting in famine is that of Erysichthon, king of Thessaly. The myth tells of Erysichthon ordering all of the trees in one of Demeter's sacred groves to be cut down, as he wanted to build an extension of his palace and hold feasts there. One tree, a huge oak, was covered with votive wreaths, symbols of the prayers Demeter had granted, so Erysichthon's men refused to cut it down. The king used an axe to cut it down, killing a dryad nymph in the process. The nymph's dying words were a curse on Erysichthon. Demeter punished the king by calling upon Limos, the spirit of unrelenting and insatiable hunger, to enter his stomach. The more the king ate, the hungrier he became. Erysichthon sold all his possessions to buy food but was still hungry. Finally, he sold his daughter, Mestra, into slavery. Mestra was freed from slavery by her former lover, Poseidon, who gave her the gift of shape-shifting into any creature to escape her bonds. Erysichthon used her shape-shifting ability to sell her numerous times to make more money to feed himself, but no amount of food was enough. Eventually, Erysichthon ate himself.

In a variation, Erysichthon tore down a temple of Demeter, wishing to build a roof for his house; she punished him the same way, and near the end of his life, she sent a snake to plague him. Afterwards, Demeter put him among the stars (the constellation Ophiuchus), as she did the snake, to continue to inflict its punishment on Erysichthon.

In the Pergamon Altar, which depicts the battle of the gods against the Giants (Gigantomachy), survive remains of what seems to have been Demeter fighting a Giant labelled "Erysichthon." Demeter is also depicted fighting against the Giants next to Hermes in the Suessula Gigantomachy vase, now housed in the Louvre Museum. Usually, ancient depictions of the Gigantomachy tend to exclude Demeter due to her non-martial nature.

Wrath myths
While travelling far and wide looking for her daughter, Demeter arrived exhausted in Attica. A woman named Misme took her in and offered her a cup of water with pennyroyal and barley groats, for it was a hot day. Demeter, in her thirst, swallowed the drink clumsily. Witnessing that, Misme's son Ascalabus laughed, mocked her, and asked her if she would like a deep jar of that drink. Demeter then poured her drink over him and turned him into a gecko, hated by both men and gods. It was said that Demeter showed her favour to those who killed geckos.

Before Hades abducted her daughter, he had kept the nymph Minthe as his mistress. But after he married Persephone, he set Minthe aside. Minthe would often brag about being lovelier than Persephone and say Hades would soon come back to her and kick Persephone out of his halls. Demeter, hearing that, grew angry and trampled Minthe; from the earth then sprang a lovely-smelling herb named after the nymph. In other versions, Persephone herself is the one who kills and turns Minthe into a plant for sleeping with Hades.

In an Argive myth, when Demeter arrived in Argolis, a man named Colontas refused to receive her in his house, whereas his daughter Chthonia disapproved of his actions. Colontas was punished by being burnt along with his house, while Demeter took Chthonia to Hermione, where she built a sanctuary for the goddess.

Demeter pinned Ascalaphus under a rock for reporting, as sole witness, to Hades that Persephone had consumed some pomegranate seeds. Later, after Heracles rolled the stone off Ascalaphus, Demeter turned him into a short-eared owl instead.

Demeter also turned the Sirens into half-bird monsters for not helping her daughter Persephone when she was abducted by Hades.

Once, the Colchian princess Medea ended a famine that plagued Corinth by making sacrifices to Demeter and the nymphs.

Favour myths

Demeter gave Triptolemus her serpent-drawn chariot and seed and bade him scatter it across the earth (teach humankind the knowledge of agriculture). Triptolemus rode through Europe and Asia until he came to the land of Lyncus, a Scythian king. Lyncus pretended to offer what's accustomed of hospitality to him, but once Triptolemus fell asleep, he attacked him with a dagger, wanting to take credit for his work. Demeter then saved Triptolemus by turning Lyncus into a lynx and ordered Triptolemus to return home airborne. Hyginus records a very similar myth, in which Demeter saves Triptolemus from an evil king named Carnabon who additionally seized Triptolemus' chariot and killed one of the dragons, so he might not escape; Demeter restored the chariot to Triptolemus, substituted the dead dragon with another one, and punished Carnabon by putting him among the stars holding a dragon as if to kill it.

During her wanderings, Demeter came upon the town of Pheneus; to the Pheneates that received her warmly and offered her shelter, she gave all sorts of pulse, except for beans, deeming it impure. Two of the Pheneates, Trisaules and Damithales, had a temple of Demeter built for her. Demeter also gifted a fig tree to Phytalus, an Eleusinian man, for welcoming her in his home.

In the tale of Eros and Psyche, Demeter, along with her sister Hera, visited Aphrodite, raging with fury about the girl who had married her son. Aphrodite asks the two to search for her; the two try to talk sense into her, arguing that her son is not a little boy, although he might appear as one, and there's no harm in him falling in love with Psyche. Aphrodite took offence at their words. Sometime later, Psyche in her wanderings came across an abandoned shrine of Demeter, and sorted out the neglected sickles and harvest implements she found there. As she was doing so, Demeter appeared to her and called from afar; she warned the girl of Aphrodite's great wrath and her plan to take revenge on her. Then Psyche begged the goddess to help her, but Demeter answered that she could not interfere and incur Aphrodite's anger at her, and for that reason, Psyche had to leave the shrine or else be kept as a captive of hers.

When her son Philomelus invented the plough and used it to cultivate the fields, Demeter was so impressed by his good work that she immortalized him in the sky by turning him into a constellation, the Boötes.

Hierax, a man of justice and distinction, set up sanctuaries for Demeter and received plenteous harvests from her in return. When the tribe neglected Poseidon favour of Demeter, the sea god destroyed all of her crops, so Hierax sent them instead his own food and was transformed into a hawk by Poseidon.

Besides giving gifts to those who were welcoming to her, Demeter was also a goddess who nursed the young; all of Plemaeus's children born by his first wife died in a cradle; Demeter took pity on him and reared herself his son Orthopolis. Plemaeus built a temple to her to thank her. Demeter also raised Trophonius, the prophetic son of either Apollo or Erginus.

Other accounts
Demeter seems to have accompanied Dionysus when he descended into the Underworld to retrieve his mother Semele in order to  visit her now married daughter, and perhaps lead her back to the land of the living for the remainder of the year. In many vases from Athens Dionysus is seen in the company of mother and daughter.

Once Tantalus, a son of Zeus, invited the gods over for dinner. Tantalus, wanting to test them, cut his son Pelops, cooked him and offered him as a meal to them. They all saw through Tantalus' crime except Demeter, who ate Pelops' shoulder before the gods brought him back to life.

Genealogy

See also

Family tree of the Greek gods
1 Ceres, the first asteroid and dwarf planet discovered, named after Demeter's Roman equivalent and called Demeter in Greek
1108 Demeter, a main belt asteroid 26 km in diameter, which was discovered in 1929 by Karl Wilhelm Reinmuth at Heidelberg.
Greek mythology in popular culture
Isis and Osiris
Law of Demeter, a software design guideline named in honour of Demeter.

References

Bibliography

Antoninus Liberalis, The Metamorphoses of Antoninus Liberalis translated by Francis Celoria (Routledge 1992). Online version at the Topos Text Project.
Apollodorus, Apollodorus, The Library, with an English Translation by Sir James George Frazer, F.B.A., F.R.S. in 2 Volumes. Cambridge, MA, Harvard University Press; London, William Heinemann Ltd. 1921. Online version at the Perseus Digital Library.
Apuleius, The golden ass, or, Metamorphoses. E. J. Kenney. 2004. London: Penguin Books.
Burkert, Walter, Greek Religion, Harvard University Press, 1985. .
Callimachus, Callimachus and Lycophron with an English Translation by A. W. Mair; Aratus, with an English Translation by G. R. Mair, London: W. Heinemann, New York: G. P. Putnam 1921. Internet Archive.
Diodorus Siculus, Library of History, Volume III: Books 4.59-8, translated by C. H. Oldfather, Loeb Classical Library No. 340. Cambridge, Massachusetts, Harvard University Press, 1939. . Online version at Internet Archive. Online version by Bill Thayer.
Gantz, Timothy, Early Greek Myth: A Guide to Literary and Artistic Sources, Johns Hopkins University Press, 1996, Two volumes:  (Vol. 1),  (Vol. 2).
Graf, Fritz. "Demeter," Brill's New Pauly, Ed. Hubert Cancik and et al. Brill Reference Online. Web. 27 September 2017.
Graves, Robert; The Greek Myths, Moyer Bell Ltd; Unabridged edition (December 1988), .
Grimal, Pierre, The Dictionary of Classical Mythology, Wiley-Blackwell, 1996. .
Halieutica in Oppian, Colluthus, Tryphiodorus. Oppian, Colluthus, and Tryphiodorus. Translated by A. W. Mair. Loeb Classical Library 219. Cambridge, MA: Harvard University Press, 1928. Online version at topos text.
Hard, Robin, The Routledge Handbook of Greek Mythology: Based on H.J. Rose's "Handbook of Greek Mythology", Psychology Press, 2004, . Google Books.
Harrison, Jane Ellen (1908), Prolegomena to the Study of Greek Religion, second edition, Cambridge: Cambridge University Press, 1908. Internet Archive.
Harrison, Jane Ellen (1928), Myths of Greece and Rome, Garden City, New York, Doubleday, Doran & Company, Inc., 1928. Online version at Internet Sacred Text Archive.
Hesiod, Theogony, in The Homeric Hymns and Homerica with an English Translation by Hugh G. Evelyn-White, Cambridge, Massachusetts, Harvard University Press; London, William Heinemann Ltd. 1914. Online version at the Perseus Digital Library.
Hesiod, Works and Days, in The Homeric Hymns and Homerica with an English Translation by Hugh G. Evelyn-White, Cambridge, Massachusetts, Harvard University Press; London, William Heinemann Ltd. 1914. Online version at the Perseus Digital Library.
Homer, The Iliad with an English Translation by A.T. Murray, Ph.D. in two volumes. Cambridge, Massachusetts, Harvard University Press; London, William Heinemann, Ltd. 1924. Online version at the Perseus Digital Library.
Homer, The Odyssey with an English Translation by A.T. Murray, PH.D. in two volumes. Cambridge, Massachusetts, Harvard University Press; London, William Heinemann, Ltd. 1919. Online version at the Perseus Digital Library.
Homeric Hymn 2 to Demeter, in The Homeric Hymns and Homerica with an English Translation by Hugh G. Evelyn-White, Cambridge, Massachusetts, Harvard University Press; London, William Heinemann Ltd. 1914. Online version at the Perseus Digital Library.
Hyginus, Gaius Julius, Fabulae, in The Myths of Hyginus, edited and translated by Mary A. Grant, Lawrence: University of Kansas Press, 1960. Online version at ToposText.
Hyginus, Gaius Julius, Astronomica from The Myths of Hyginus translated and edited by Mary Grant. University of Kansas Publications in Humanistic Studies. Online version at the Topos Text Project.
Kerényi, Karl (1951), The Gods of the Greeks, Thames and Hudson, London, 1951.
Kerényi, Karl (1967), Eleusis: Archetypal Image of Mother and Daughter, Princeton University Press, 1991. .
Kerényi, Karl (1976), Dionysos: Archetypal Image of Indestructible Life, Princeton University Press, 1996. .
Kern, Otto. Orphicorum Fragmenta, Berlin, 1922. Internet Archive.
Lycophron, Alexandra in Callimachus and Lycophron with an English translation by A. W. Mair ; Aratus, with an English translation by G. R. Mair, London: W. Heinemann, New York: G. P. Putnam 1921. Internet Archive.
McKay, Kenneth John, Erysichthon, Brill Archive, 1962.
Morford, Mark P. O., Robert J. Lenardon, Classical Mythology, Eighth Edition, Oxford University Press, 2007. .
Martin P. Nilsson, Greek Popular Religion, 1940. Sacred-texts.com
Ovid. Metamorphoses, Volume I: Books 1-8. Translated by Frank Justus Miller. Revised by G. P. Goold. Loeb Classical Library No. 42. Cambridge, Massachusetts: Harvard University Press, 1977, first published 1916. . Online version at Harvard University Press.
The Oxford Classical Dictionary, second edition, Hammond, N.G.L. and Howard Hayes Scullard (editors), Oxford University Press, 1992. .
Pausanias, Pausanias Description of Greece with an English Translation by W.H.S. Jones, Litt.D., and H.A. Ormerod, M.A., in 4 Volumes. Cambridge, Massachusetts, Harvard University Press; London, William Heinemann Ltd. 1918. Online version at the Perseus Digital Library.
 
Smith, William, Dictionary of Greek and Roman Biography and Mythology, London (1873). Online version at the Perseus Digital Library.
Strabo, The Geography of Strabo. Edition by H.L. Jones. Cambridge, Mass.: Harvard University Press; London: William Heinemann, Ltd. 1924. Online version at the Perseus Digital Library.
Tripp, Edward, Crowell's Handbook of Classical Mythology, Thomas Y. Crowell Co; First edition (June 1970). .
West, M. L. (1983), The Orphic Poems, Clarendon Press Oxford, 1983. .
West, M. L. (2007), Indo-European Poetry and Myth, OUP Oxford, 2007. . Google Books.

External links

Hymn to Demeter, Ancient Greek and English text, Interlinear Translation edited & adapted from the 1914 prose translation by Hugh G. Evelyn-White, with Greek-English glossary, notes and illustrations.
Foley P. Helene, The Homeric hymn to Demeter: translation, commentary, and interpretive essays, Princeton Univers. Press, 1994. with Ancient Greek text and English translation.
Text of Homeric Hymn to Demeter
Online book of Martin P. Nilsson, Greek Popular Religion
"The Political Cosmology of the Homeric Hymn to Demeter"
"The Sophian Prayer to Demeter"

Abundance goddesses
Agricultural goddesses
Children of Cronus
Chthonic beings
Deities in the Iliad
 
Divine women of Zeus
Earth goddesses
Fertility goddesses
Food goddesses
Greek goddesses
Harvest goddesses
Horse deities
Justice goddesses
Kourotrophoi
Metamorphoses characters
Mother goddesses
Mythological rape victims
Nature goddesses
Primordial teachers
Rape of Persephone
Seasons
Shapeshifters in Greek mythology
Spring deities
Twelve Olympians
Women of Helios
Women of Poseidon